Robin's plantain or poor Robin's plantain is a common name for several plants native to eastern North America and may refer to:
 Erigeron pulchellus  in the family Asteraceae. E. pulchellus has white or pink flowers.
 Erigeron philadelphicus, also in the family Asteraceae.
 Hieracium venosum in the family Asteraceae.  H. venosum has yellow flowers.

References